Joseph William Rue (June 14, 1898 – December 1, 1984) was a professional baseball umpire who worked in the American League from 1938 to 1947. Rue umpired 1,519 major league games in his 10-year career. He also umpired in the 1943 World Series and All-Star Game.

See also

 List of Major League Baseball umpires

External links
Joe Rue Oral History Interview (1 of 6) - National Baseball Hall of Fame Digital Collection
Joe Rue Oral History Interview (2 of 6) - National Baseball Hall of Fame Digital Collection
Joe Rue Oral History Interview (3 of 6) - National Baseball Hall of Fame Digital Collection
Joe Rue Oral History Interview (4 of 6) - National Baseball Hall of Fame Digital Collection
Joe Rue Oral History Interview (5 of 6) - National Baseball Hall of Fame Digital Collection
Joe Rue Oral History Interview (6 of 6) - National Baseball Hall of Fame Digital Collection

References

1898 births
1984 deaths
Major League Baseball umpires
Sportspeople from Kentucky